Vishal Veeru Devgan (born 2 April 1969), known professionally as Ajay Devgn, is an Indian actor, film director and producer who works primarily in Hindi cinema. Devgn has appeared in over a hundred films and has won numerous accolades, including four National Film Awards and four Filmfare Awards. In 2016, he was honoured by the Government of India with the Padma Shri, the fourth-highest civilian honour of the country.

Devgn began his professional career with Phool Aur Kaante in 1991. He then rose to prominence as an action hero starring in successful films such as Jigar (1992), Dilwale (1994), Diljale (1996). He went on to give critically acclaimed performances in Hum Dil De Chuke Sanam (1999), Company (2002), Deewangee (2002), for Zakhm (1998) and The Legend of Bhagat Singh (2002), he won National Film Award for Best Actor. After the success of Golmaal: Fun Unlimited (2006), he went on to collaborate with Rohit Shetty on a number of action-comedies including Golmaal Returns (2008), All the Best: Fun Begins (2009), Golmaal 3 (2010), Singham (2011), Bol Bachchan (2012), Singham Returns (2014), and Golmaal Again (2017). His highest-grossing movies include Total Dhamaal (2019), Tanhaji (2020) and Drishyam 2 (2022).

Devgn owns a production company Ajay Devgn FFilms, which was established in 2000. In 2008, he debuted as a film director with U Me Aur Hum.

Family background and marriage 

Devgn was born to a Punjabi Hindu Saraswath-Vishwakarma family originally from Amritsar, Punjab. The family has connections to the Hindi film industry in Mumbai. Devgn's father, Veeru Devgan, was a stunt choreographer and action-film director and his mother, Veena, is a film producer. His cousin, Anil Devgan, is a filmmaker and screenwriter. Devgn graduated from the Silver Beach High School in Juhu and then studied at Mithibai College.

Devgn began a relationship with the actress Karisma Kapoor while filming Jigar, however, the couple ended their relationship in 1995. That same year, Devgn's relationship with the actress, Kajol Mukherjee, began whilst they were co-starring in Gundaraj. The media called them "an unlikely pair" due to their contrasting personalities. On 24 February 1999, the couple married in a traditional Maharashtrian Hindu ceremony at the Devgan home. The couple has two children. Their daughter, Nysa, was born in 2003 and their son, Yug, was born in 2010. Devgn and Kajol stored their newborn son's umbilical cord blood and tissues to act as a source of stem cells in case of serious ailment. In August 2009, Devgn changed the spelling of his surname Devgan to Devgn, at the request of his family. He is a practicing Shaiva Hindu who prominently wears a Rudraksha which, along with other religious themes, features in his films. Devgn was the first Bollywood personality to own a private jet for transport to shooting locations, to promotions and for personal trips.

Career

Film debut, breakthrough and rise to prominence (1991–99) 

As Devgn entered the film industry in 1991, he changed his stage name from his birth name, Vishal, to "Ajay" due to several other actors named Vishal being launched at the same time, including Manoj Kumar's son. He began his professional career in Phool Aur Kaante and received a Filmfare Award for Best Male Debut. He co-starred with Madhoo. In his opening scene, Devgn performed a split while balancing between two motorcycles. His next film was Jigar (1992), a Bollywood martial arts film co-starring Karisma Kapoor. It was released on Diwali weekend and became the seventh-highest-grossing movie of that year, taking  at the box office.

In 1993, Devgn starred in Dil Hai Betaab, a movie about a love triangle and romantic themes such as revenge. He next featured in Divya Shakti and then Sangram, a story of enmity between two fathers. Devgn then worked with Deepak Bahry, who directed the action film Ek Hi Raasta, and with Deepak Pawar, who directed Platform. Other releases that year were Shaktiman, Dhanwan and Bedardi.

In 1994, Devgn starred in Harry Baweja's romantic action film Dilwale. He played the part of Arun Saxena, a man with intellectual impairment. The movie was the tenth-highest-grossing movie of the year. His next release was Kanoon and then Kuku Kohli's Suhaag with Akshay Kumar. The movie was about two friends. Devgn played Ajay Sharma/Malhotra. Suhaag was the seventh-highest-grossing movie of the year. His next film was Vijaypath. Shooting dates for Vijaypath clashed with those of Karan Arjun which Devgn declined. Vijaypath was the eighth-highest-grossing film of the year.

In 1995, Devgn appeared in Mahesh Bhatt's movie Naajayaz and then Hulchul directed by Milan Luthria. Kajol co-starred. Devgn and Kajol then appeared in Gundaraj which did not perform well at the box office. His next release was Haqeeqat costarring with Tabu. This film was the eleventh-highest-grossing movie of the year.

In 1996, Devgn starred in the action movie Jung with Mithun Chakraborty, Rambha and Aditya Pancholi. His next release was an action movie called Jaan, with Twinkle Khanna. He then starred in Harry Baweja's film Diljale, where he played a terrorist character called Shaka.

In 1997, Devgn starred in a poorly received movie, Itihaas, with Twinkle Khanna. His next release was Indra Kumar's romantic comedy Ishq with Aamir Khan, Juhi Chawla and Kajol. In this successful film, Devgn played Ajay, a rich boy in love with a poor girl, (Kajol). The film grossed . The film was the fourth-highest-grossing film of the year.

In 1998, Devgn starred in Major Saab with Amitabh Bachchan and Sonali Bendre where he played the character of an army officer. The movie was successful and was the tenth-highest-grossing film of the year. He next starred with Kajol in Anees Bazmee's second film, the romantic comedy Pyaar To Hona Hi Tha, a remake of the 1995 American film French Kiss. It grossed . Devgn's next release was Mahesh Bhatt's drama Zakhm, which examines communal tension in Mumbai during riots. Devgn played a man who is fed up with religious conflict. Devgn won several awards for his critically acclaimed performance, including the National Film Award for Best Actor and the Star Screen Award for Best Actor.

In 1999, Devgn starred in the romantic drama Hum Dil De Chuke Sanam, in which he played Vanraj, a man who tries to help his wife (Aishwarya Rai) reunite with her lover (Salman Khan). Hum Dil De Chuke Sanam marked a significant turning point in Devgn's career. The film, an adaptation of Maitreyi Devi's Bengali novel Na Hanyate, was directed by Sanjay Leela Bhansali and co-starred Salman Khan and Aishwarya Rai. Devgn was highly praised for his performance. Rediff said: "Ajay's role reminds you of one he did in another film, Pyaar Toh Hona Hi Tha. There he is searching for the boyfriend of the girl he secretly loves. But intense scenes are his forte and he does well here. He's particularly good in the scene where he gets exasperated with his wife's stubbornness and strives to keep his cool." The movie was successful and Devgn was nominated for the Filmfare best actor award. After that, he appeared in Hindustan Ki Kasam with Amitabh Bachchan and Sonali Bendre. He then worked with the director Milan Luthria in Kachche Dhaage, with Saif Ali Khan and Manisha Koirala. The movie was a box-office hit. He then performed in the successful movie Hogi Pyaar Ki Jeet, a romantic comedy, and then in his home production movie with Kajol, and director, Prakash Jha. The film was titled Dil Kya Kare. His other movies in 1999 were Gair and Thakshak in which he played a strong, silent man.

Critical acclaim and awards success (2000–09) 
In 2000, Devgn performed in Harry Baweja's Deewane. The film did not do well at the box office. In the same year, Devgn starred in his first home production; Raju Chacha, with Kajol. The film was moderately successful.

In 2001, Devgn starred in another moderately successful film; Yeh Raaste Hain Pyaar Ke with Madhuri Dixit and Preity Zinta. His next release was Lajja, with Manisha Koirala, Madhuri Dixit, Jackie Shroff and Anil Kapoor. He was nominated for the Filmfare Best Supporting Actor Award. However, the film was not popular with the public. Mahesh Manjrekar's Tera Mera Saath Rahen followed.

In 2002, Devgn performed in Ram Gopal Varma's fictional examination of the Mumbai underworld in the film Company. Devgn played a gangster named Malik. Both Company and Devgn's performance received critical acclaim. As Taran Adarsh reviewed: "Ajay Devgn enacts his role to perfection. A controlled performance, the actor takes to this complex character like a fish takes to water. He underplays his part with admirable ease." Devgn was nominated for the Filmfare Best Actor Award and won the Filmfare Critics Award for Best Actor. Devgn's next release was David Dhawan's comedy Hum Kisise Kum Nahin, with Amitabh Bachchan, Sanjay Dutt and Aishwarya Rai. The same year, he played the role of Bhagat Singh, in Rajkumar Santoshi's biopic The Legend of Bhagat Singh. His performance was well received by critics. Taran Adarsh said, "Ajay Devgn has lived the role. To state that he is excellent would be an understatement. His performance is bound to win admiration from cinegoers, besides fetching awards." The film was released on 7 June 2002 and went on to win two National Film Awards, including the National Film Award for Best Feature Film in Hindi, and three Filmfare Awards, including the Filmfare Critics Award for Best Movie. Despite these awards, and Devgn winning his second National Film Award for Best Actor for his performance, the film was not popular with the public. Devgn went on to perform in Anees Bazmee's Deewangee. The film was partially inspired by William Diehl's novel, Primal Fear. The film earned Devgn several awards for his role including a Filmfare Best Villain Award, the Star Screen Award for Best Villain and the Zee Cine Award for Best Actor in a Negative Role. The film was a success at the box office.

In 2003, Devgn starred in Ram Gopal Verma's horror film Bhoot, opposite Urmila Matondkar. The film was appreciated critically and performed well at the box office. He then starred in the action thriller Qayamat: City Under Threat with the actress debutante, Neha Dhupia. The film was a commercial success. Devgn next performed in Milan Luthria's romantic film Chori Chori, opposite Rani Mukherji and Sonali Bendre. This film did not succeed at the box office. Devgn's next release of the year was Prakash Jha's Gangaajal. The film was set in the time of the blinding incident in Bhagalpur, Bihar. Rediff.com said, "Ajay Devgan pulls up an ace with a part tailormade to reinforce his seething-under-the-surface angry hero image. To his credit (and the director's), he brings style and grace to a largely stereotypical, righteous protagonist. To a great extent, his presence covers up the film's patchiness in the second half." Devgn was nominated for the Filmfare Best Actor Award for this performance. He then worked in Rohit Shetty's directional debut Zameen and J. P. Dutta's war film LOC Kargil.

In 2004, Devgn was cast with Amitabh Bachchan, Aishwarya Rai and Akshay Kumar in Rajkumar Santoshi's action thriller Khakee. The film was released on 23 January 2004. It received positive reviews and became one of the highest-grossing films of 2004. In Khakee, Devgn once again played a villain. His performance as a police officer turned murderer was well received by critics. Taran Adarsh said: "Ajay Devgan adds yet another feather in his cap with a performance that could've been played only by a master performer. His confrontations with Amitabh Bachchan are exemplary." Later in 2004, Devgn appeared in Indra Kumar's Masti: Sanam Teri Kasam. He also starred in Yuva.

Devgn next collaborated with Rituparno Ghosh in the relationship drama Raincoat, with Aishwaraya Rai. The film is an adaptation of O. Henry's The Gift of the Magi. Raincoat met with wide critical acclaim and won the National Film Award for Best Feature Film in Hindi. Devgn was praised for his performance. Rediff said: "Hesitation, desperation, humiliation – Ajay Devgn conveys them eloquently. His Manoj is no cool dude, but just another lower middle-class guy in misery, with whom none would like to switch place. He particularly stands out in the scenes where he cries in the bathroom, or begs Neeru not to marry someone else." In 2004, Devgn was also seen in a cameo appearance in Taarzan: The Wonder Car.

2005 was a less successful year for Devgn. His movies were not financially successful. They included Insan, Blackmail, Main Aisa Hi Hoon, Tango Charlie and Shikhar. However, the films Kaal and Apaharan did well. For his performance in Apaharan, Devgn was nominated for the National Film Award for Best Actor and the Filmfare Best Actor Award. His performance as a villain in Kaal also earned him a nomination for the Filmfare Best Villain Award.

In 2006 Devgn played Othello in Omkara, a Hindi adaptation of William Shakespeare's Othello. It was directed by Vishal Bhardwaj. The film is a tragedy of sexual jealousy set against the backdrop of the political system in Uttar Pradesh. It premiered at the 2006 Cannes Film Festival and was screened at the Cairo International Film Festival. Omkara was well received by critics. Rediff said: "Othello is a tricky role, a leading man eclipsed by the villain. Yet the Moor is a brooding and compelling character, and Ajay Devgn does valiantly with his material. Omkara strips Othello of the racism, exchanging his black skin for surprisingly inconsequential half-Brahminism. Ajay's best bits are when restrained, and while there is a bit of a seen-that feel to his character, by the time the film is over, you realise just how unflinchingly solid he's been." Taran Adarsh said: "Ajay makes a stirring and powerful interpretation of a man haunted by uncertainty about his lover's faithfulness. The serious look that Ajay carries suits him to the T. Of course, Ajay is exceptional in the film and looks every inch the character he portrays."

In 2006, Devgn also starred in Rohit Shetty's Golmaal. It had two sequels Golmaal Returns and Golmaal 3. In the same year, Devgn was featured in a short documentary about the Mumbai floods of 2005 titled The Awakening.

In 2007 Devgn starred in two movies, director Anubhav Sinha's action thriller Cash and Aag.

In 2008, Devgn performed in the social film Halla Bol, directed by Rajkumar Santoshi. Also in the cast were Pankaj Kapoor and Vidya Balan. The film is based on the life of activist Safdar Hashmi, who was killed in 1989 by political rivals while performing in the street play Halla Bol. The film received harsh reviews.

In 2008, Devgn also performed in Rohit Shetty's third film Sunday. He then took the lead role with Kajol in his own directorial debut film U Me Aur Hum. The film performed moderately well at the box office and earned positive critical reviews for his performance as well as for his direction. Rediff said: "His character grows, discovers both shirt-buttons and subtlety, delivering an intense acting job. Speaking almost entirely in platitudes – pithy at first, profound as he goes on – this grows into an extraordinarily well-written character, replete with flaws and relatability. The way he treats his remorse, drunkenly pointing every finger at himself around a dinner table, is superbly handled, as is his guilty struggle to delineate his life experience from his professional opinion." Devgn also made a cameo appearance in his brother Anil Devgan's film Haal-e-Dil. He then starred in Afzal Khan's Mehbooba.

Again in 2008, Devgn performed in Rohit Shetty's comedy Golmaal Returns, a sequel to the 2006 film Golmaal: Fun Unlimited about a mistrustful wife who believed her husband was unfaithful. The Indian Express said the screenplay was derivative, concluding: "There is nothing particularly new about a suspicious wife keeping tabs on her husband, and there is nothing particularly new in the way Ajay-Kareena play it."

In 2009, Devgn produced his third film, All the Best, directed by Rohit Shetty. It had some financial success. Next, Devgn starred in Vipul Shah's London Dreams, with Salman Khan and the Tamil film star Asin. The film was not popular with the public.

Commercial success (2010–present) 

In the following decade, Devgn performed roles in Once Upon a Time in Mumbaai (2010), Golmaal 3 (2010), Raajneeti (2010), Singham (2011), Bol Bachchan (2012), Son of Sardaar (2012), Singham Returns (2014) and Drishyam (2015). In 2010, Devgn featured in the financially successful comedy Atithi Tum Kab Jaoge? with Paresh Rawal and Konkona Sen Sharma. He then featured in Prakash Jha's political thriller Raajneeti. Raajneeti was released internationally on 4 June 2010, after some controversies regarding similarities between actual people and the characters in the film. There were also issues about the use of the national anthem in the film. The film was made with a budget of  When the film was released, it had positive reviews and was financially successful. Again, in 2010, Devgn starred in Milan Luthria's Once Upon a Time in Mumbaai, which was among the top-grossing films of that year. Both the film and Devgn's performance were well received by the critics. Taran Adarsh said: "Ajay Devgn is splendid as Sultan. The actor had enacted a similar role in Company, but it must be said that his interpretation is so different in Once Upon A Time in Mumbaai. He adds so much depth to the character, which only goes to prove his range and versatility. This is, without a trace of doubt, Ajay's finest work so far." Komal Nahta said: "Ajay Devgn is simply fantastic in the role of Sultan Mirza. So real is his performance that it looks like he was born to play this role. Right from his look to his acting including dialogue-delivery, everything is fabulous. Indeed, an award-winning performance!"

Devgn then starred in Priyadarshan's action-thriller film Aakrosh. The movie explores the subject of honour killings. Aakrosh received some positive reviews, but was financially unsuccessful. At the end of 2010, Devgn worked again with Rohit Shetty in Golmaal 3, a sequel to Golmaal Returns (2008). Devgn also worked as a voice artist in Toonpur Ka Superrhero, an animated film.

In 2011, Devgn performed with Emraan Hashmi in Madhur Bhandarkar's comedy Dil Toh Baccha Hai Ji. He was a narrator in Yamla Pagla Deewana and also made a cameo appearance in Ready. Devgn starred in Rohit Shetty's Singham. Taran Adarsh said: "The title means 'Lion' and Ajay is in the centre of the battle between good and evil. Ajay is well known for the lines, "aataa maajhi satakli". The embodiment of screen masculinity, Ajay enacts the central character of a righteous, hardhearted cop with flourish. He brings alive on screen a larger-than-life hero character with determined conviction, which renders you thunderstruck. One of the few actors who underplays his part admirably, he returns to the over-the-top-action genre of films with this one. In a nutshell, his performance plays a pivotal role in carrying the film to the winning post." He then starred David Dhawan's action comedy film Rascals.

The following year, Devgn starred in Tezz, directed by Priyadarshan. His co-stars were Anil Kapoor, Boman Irani, Kangana Ranaut, Sameera Reddy and Zayed Khan. Devgn then starred in Rohit Shetty's film Bol Bachchan. He then starred in Son of Sardaar. In 2013, Devgn featured in the critically and commercially unsuccessful remake of Himmatwala. Devgn next featured in Prakash Jha's political drama Satyagraha.

In 2014, Devgn featured in Rohit Shetty's Singham Returns, a sequel to Singham. Singham Returns received mixed reviews from Indian critics. Taran Adarsh of Bollywood Hungama gave it 4 stars and said: "The film is a complete mass entertainer with power-packed drama, hi-intensity dialogue and towering performances as its aces. The brand value attached to it coupled with a long weekend will help the film reap a harvest and rule the box office in days to come.". Devgn next featured in Prabhu Deva's Action Jackson which did not perform well at box office.

In 2015, Devgn starred in Drishyam, directed by Nishikant Kamat. The film received positive reviews, Meena Iyer of The Times of India gave the film four out of five stars, describing it as "A suspense drama with a nail-biting finish." She praised Devgan's performances: "Ajay, who is the prey here, shines in his role of the protective father.".

In 2016, Devgn was seen in his own production, Shivaay, which released around Diwali 2016. Shivaay is an action drama movie. In 2017, Devgn featured in director Milan Luthria's Baadshaho and Rohit Shetty's Golmaal Again. Both films were mild commercial successes. While Baadshaho was a hit, Golmaal Again became the highest-grossing film of 2017 collecting 100 crores in 4 days of its release and a lifetime collection of 205 crores at the Indian box office while making a hefty 300 crores at worldwide box office.

In 2018, Devgn starred in Raj Kumar Gupta's Raid where he plays the role of an honest Indian Revenue Service officer, which released to positive critical feedback on 16 March, and was a commercial success. Devgn has long been working on producing Sons of Sardaar: The Battle of Saragari, a sequel to Son of Sardaar. In August 2017, Devgn stated: "We are working on the script but it won’t happen for another two years because of the scale of the project." He starred in De De Pyaar De alongside Tabu and Rakul Preet Singh. In early 2020, Devgn portrayed the role of 17th-century military leader Tanaji Malusare in an eponymously titled film, Tanhaji; directed by Om Raut. The film was released on 10 January 2020 and went on to win three National Film Awards, including the Best Popular Film Providing Wholesome Entertainment and Best Actor 'Tanhaji - The Unsung Warrior' earned Rs 3.67 billion ($49 million) worldwide, making it the highest-grossing Bollywood film of 2020. Moreover, it marks Ajay Devgn's 100th film as an actor.

In 2021, he starred alongside Sanjay Dutt, Sharad Kelkar, Nora Fatehi and Sonakshi Sinha in the historical film, Bhuj: The Pride of India and had a cameo in Sooryavanshi, reprising as DCP Bajirao Singham.

In 2022, Devgn made his OTT debut with the web series, Rudra: The Edge of Darkness, on Disney+ Hotstar. The same year, he released his third directorial, Runway 34. It received positive reviews from both the critics and audience. He was also seen in extended cameo appearances in Sanjay Leela Bhansali's Gangubai Kathiawadi and S. S. Rajamouli's RRR, for which he got great admiration. Later that year, Devgn was seen as Chitragupt in Indra Kumar's Thank God, which also starred Sidharth Malhotra, which turned out to be a commercial failure. Later he starred in the sequel to Drishyam, Drishyam 2, directed by Abhishek Pathak. It became a huge critical and commercial success, along with becoming his second highest-grossing film of his career, after Tanhaji. 

In 2023, Ajay is set to star in the remake of Kaithi, titled Bholaa, which is his 4th directorial venture. Other projects for him in 2023 includes the sports-drama Maidaan and Neeraj Pandey's Auron Mein Kahan Dum Tha, which is currently filiming.

With Singham Again, the much awaited sequel to the smash-hit Singham Returns and Anees Bazmee's Naam Ajay Devgn has already a packed schedule for 2024.

Filmography

Production 

Ajay Devgn FFilms (ADF) is an Indian film production and distribution company established by actor Ajay Devgn in 2000. Based in Mumbai, it mainly produces and distributes Hindi films. In 2000, ADF released its first film, Raju Chacha. The film starred Devgn himself as the lead actor and his wife Kajol as the lead actress. Raju Chacha received mixed reviews but grossed Rs 209.2 millions at the box office.

In 2008, Devgn co-produced the drama U Me Aur Hum, which marked his directorial debut. Devgn also played the lead role in the film, sharing the screen again with Kajol. The film was written by Devgn himself and three other writers. Critical reception was generally positive, with Taran Adarsh giving the film 4 out of 5 stars and describing it as "A well-made, absorbing love story that's high on emotional quotient".

In 2009, Devgn released and acted in his home production All the Best: Fun Begins, which was directed by Rohit Shetty and also starring, Sanjay Dutt, Fardeen Khan, Bipasha Basu and Mugdha Godse. The film was released on 16 October 2009 and received positive response from critics. It was rated a hit in India, and is the twelfth highest grossing Bollywood film of 2009.

In 2014, ADF produced Singham Returns starring Devgn and Kareena Kapoor. In 2016 Devgn produced and starred in Shivaay which is to be the most expensive film of his production.

In late December 2017, ADF collaborated with Fox Star Studios to produce Total Dhamaal starring Devgn, Riteish Deshmukh, Arshad Warsi, Javed Jaffrey, Madhuri Dixit, and Anil Kapoor.

NY VFXWAALA 
In October 2015, Devgn established a visual effects company, NY VFXWAALA, after his children. It has been involved with many major films, such as Prem Ratan Dhan Payo, Tamasha, Bajirao Mastani, Mersal, Dilwale, Force 2, and Simmba. The company won the Best Special Effects award at the 64th National Film Awards for the film Shivaay (2016).

Other works 

Devgn's production company Ajay Devgn FFilms, was established in 2000. The company's first film was Raju Chacha (2000), starring Devgn and Kajol. In 2008, Devgn made his directorial debut and co-produced U Me Aur Hum. Devgn was part of the drama film's team of four writers. The film tells the story of a woman (Kajol) who has a very weak memory and even forgets her own husband. Taran Adarsh, a film critic, described it as "a well-made, absorbing love story that's high on the emotional quotient."

In 2009, Devgn released his home production All the Best: Fun Begins, which was directed by Rohit Shetty and starred Devgn, Sanjay Dutt, Fardeen Khan, Bipasha Basu and Mugdha Godse. The film was released on 16 October 2009, and was the ninth-highest-grossing Bollywood film of 2009.

In 2012, Devgn starred in Rohit Shetty's romantic action comedy film Bol Bachchan, which was a joint production with Shree Ashtavinayak Cine Vision Ltd. It also featured Abhishek Bachchan, Asin and Prachi Desai. The film was released on 6 July 2012 in about 2,575 cinemas around the world and had 2,700 prints. It received mixed reviews but had a good opening at the box office. The film had record advance bookings. Bol Bachchan was one of the highest-grossing Bollywood films. It took .

Devgn also starred in Ashwni Dhir's romantic action comedy film Son of Sardaar, which was a joint production with Viacom 18 Motion Pictures. The film was released on 13 November 2012. Despite competition with Yash Raj's film Jab Tak Hai Jaan, Son of Sardaar was a financial success. It made .

In 2018, Ajay Devgn released his first Marathi production Aapla Manus. The movie was in Marathi language. It was directed by Satish Rajwade and starred Nana Patekar, Iravati Harshe, and Sumeet Raghavan. The film was produced by Ajay Devgn, Nana Patekar, Abhinav Shuklaa, Manish Mishra, & Rohit Choudhary and released on 9 February 2018. The story was a dramatic thriller and written by Vivek Bele. The film was distributed by Viacom 18 Motion Pictures.

Awards and honours

See also 
 List of Indian actors

References

Bibliography

External links 

 Official Site
 
 
 
 

Ajay Devgn
Indian male film actors
 Indian Hindus
Punjabi Hindus
1969 births
Living people
Best Actor National Film Award winners
Filmfare Awards winners
Screen Awards winners
Zee Cine Awards winners
Male actors from Delhi
Film producers from Mumbai
Film directors from Mumbai
Hindi-language film directors
Male actors in Hindi cinema
Punjabi people
Mithibai College alumni
21st-century Indian male actors
20th-century Indian male actors
Male actors from Mumbai
Recipients of the Padma Shri in arts
Male actors from New Delhi
Hindi film producers